Yokoshima (written: 横嶋) is a Japanese surname. Notable people with the surname include:

, Japanese handball player
 Hisashi Yokoshima (born 1957), Japanese racing driver
 Kaoru Yokoshima (born 1985), Japanese handball player
 Yoshikazu Yokoshima (born 1952), Japanese golfer